Mohamad Tajol Rosli bin Mohamed Ghazali (born 6 November 1946) was the 9th Menteri Besar of Perak from 1999 to 2008. He is also the Member of Parliament of Gerik from 1978 to 1995, the Member of Perak State Legislative Assembly for Kenering from 1974 to 1977, 1999 to 2004 and for Pengkalan Hulu from 2004 to 2013.

Education 
In 1964, he furthered his studies at the University of Melbourne, Australia and graduated with a Bachelor of Commerce.

Politics 
Tajol gave up his positions as Perak Barisan Nasional chief and member of the state Umno liaison committee to then Deputy Prime Minister Datuk Seri Najib Tun Razak on 30 January 2009. Then minister in the Prime Minister's department, Datuk Seri Ahmad Zahid Hamidi became Najib's deputy in Perak.

Election results

Honours

Honours of Malaysia
Tajol received the Panglima Setia Mahkota (P.S.M.) award which carries the title 'Tan Sri' from Yang di-Pertuan Agong, Tuanku Mizan Zainal Abidin, the Sultan of Terengganu in conjunction with His Majesty's 48th official birthday on 5 June 2010.
  :
  Commander of the Order of Loyalty to the Crown of Malaysia (PSM) – Tan Sri (2010)
  :
  Member of the Order of the Perak State Crown (AMP) (1979)
  Knight Commander of the Order of the Perak State Crown (DPMP) – Dato' (1986)
  Knight Grand Commander of the Order of the Perak State Crown (SPMP) – Dato' Seri (1999)
  Ordinary Class of the Perak Family Order of Sultan Azlan Shah (SPSA) – Dato' Seri DiRaja (2000)
  :
  Grand Commander of the Exalted Order of Malacca (DGSM) – Datuk Seri (2003)

References

 

Chief Ministers of Perak
Malaysian people of Malay descent
Malaysian Muslims
Living people
1946 births
People from Perak
University of Melbourne alumni
Government ministers of Malaysia
United Malays National Organisation politicians
Members of the Perak State Legislative Assembly
Members of the Dewan Rakyat
Perak state executive councillors
Commanders of the Order of Loyalty to the Crown of Malaysia